Charles DeForest Cummings (July 15, 1880 – June 15, 1957) was an American football player and coach. He served as the head football coach at Syracuse University from 1911 to 1912, compiling a record of 9–8–2.

Head coaching record

References

1880 births
1957 deaths
19th-century players of American football
Syracuse Orange football coaches
Syracuse Orange football players
Sportspeople from Erie County, New York
People from Springville, New York
Players of American football from New York (state)